Abels is a surname. Notable people with the surname include:

 Erika Abels (1896–1975), Austrian painter and graphic artist
 Fred Abels (*1961), Dutch artist
 Jacob Abels (1803–1866), Dutch painter
 Michael Abels (born 1962), American classical composer
 Paul Abels (1937–1992), American Methodist minister
 Roos Abels (born 1999), Dutch fashion model

See also
 Abel (surname)